This is a list of all the United States Supreme Court cases from volume 551 of the United States Reports:

References

External links

2007 in United States case law